Camillo Ragona (1604 – 1 August 1677) was a Roman Catholic prelate who served as Bishop of Capaccio (1665–1677) and Bishop of Acerno (1644–1665).

Biography
Camillo Ragona was born in Tricarico, Italy in 1604.
On 17 October 1644, he was appointed during the papacy of Pope Innocent X as Bishop of Acerno.
On 23 October 1644, he was consecrated bishop by Francesco Maria Brancaccio, Cardinal-Priest of Santi XII Apostoli, with Tommaso Carafa, Bishop of Capaccio, and Luigi Pappacoda, Bishop of Lecce, serving as co-consecrators. 
On 13 April 1665, he was appointed during the papacy of Pope Alexander VII as Bishop of Capaccio.
He served as Bishop of Capaccio until his death on 1 August 1677.

References

External links and additional sources
 (for Chronology of Bishops) 
 (for Chronology of Bishops) 
 (for Chronology of Bishops) 
 (for Chronology of Bishops) 

17th-century Italian Roman Catholic bishops
Bishops appointed by Pope Innocent X
Bishops appointed by Pope Alexander VII
1604 births
1677 deaths